The 3rd Brahmans were an infantry regiment of the British Indian Army. They could trace their origins to 1798, when they were the 1st Battalion, 16th Bengal Native Infantry. Over the years they were known by a number of different names. The 32nd Bengal Native Infantry 1824–1861, the 3rd Regiment of Bengal Native Infantry 1861–1885, the 3rd Regiment of Bengal Infantry 1885–1901 and finally after the Kitchener reforms of the Indian Army when the names of the presidencies were dropped; the 3rd Brahmans. Before being disbanded in 1922, they had taken part in the Second Anglo-Afghan War and World War I.

References

British Indian Army infantry regiments
Honourable East India Company regiments
Military units and formations established in 1798
Military units and formations disestablished in 1922
Bengal Presidency
1798 establishments in the British Empire